Minino is a rural locality (a village) in Kubenskoye Rural Settlement, Vologodsky District, Vologda Oblast, Russia. The population was 42 as of 2002.

Geography 
The distance to Vologda is 45 km, to Kubenskoye is 17 km. Voronino is the nearest rural locality.

References 

Rural localities in Vologodsky District